Marion Nicholl Rawson (June 24, 1878 – December 4, 1956) was an author, illustrator, artist and lecturer.

Personal life
She was born Edna Marion Nicholl on June 24, 1878 and grew up in Scotch Plains, New Jersey. She first started sewing blocks for quilts at two years of age, carefully making two squares a day. She graduated from Swarthmore College in 1898 and then taught drawing in New York City.

On June 15, 1907, Edna Marion Nicholl married Jonathan Ansel Rawson, Jr., the son of Jonathan Ansel Rawson and Charlotte Fletcher Rawson. Jonathan was an Amherst College graduate and journalist. From 1907 to 1910, Jonathan was in the export business. Then, he worked in publishing and journalism. During World War II, he did YMCA war work and was a member of the home defense organization, Riverside Reserves.

The couple had two children, Jonathan, who was born in 1910, and Priscilla.

In 1917, Marion Nicholl Rawson served on the Executive Committee of the National Birth Control League. She was on the Connecticut Women Suffrage Association's Executive Board in 1918. By 1920, the Rawsons lived in Sound Beach, Connecticut. They purchased an early 19th-century house in East Alstead, New Hampshire, a small town north of Keene and called it "the Little House." They maintained it in its original state, without electricity or running water, and she used it as a site of her historical researches and paintings. Throughout her life, Rawson spent the summers there. The Rawson homestead in the center of East Alstead had been in the family since 1782 but went to another branch of the family.

Rawson was left a widow when her husband died suddenly in Hamilton, New York on April 29, 1928. She died on December 4, 1956 and was buried in the East Alstead Cemetery, East Alstead, Cheshire County, New Hampshire.

Career
After having married, Rawson worked as an author, historian, lecturer, watercolor painter and sketch artist. She sketched and painted all her life, holding frequent sales of her work in Bellows Falls, Vermont, Alstead, Providence and other places in New England. She was a long-time member of the Providence Art Club.

Rawson wrote and illustrated books on the homemade arts and crafts of the early American home, farm, shop and countryside, which she spent years researching. As a result, "she has rendered an invaluable service to those who are interested in the development of our early arts and have a hearty respect for the beautiful old treasures produced by craftsmen who loved their product and held in mind beauty of line and form as well as suitability of purpose."

One of her books, Sing, Old House, published in 1934, was written about old houses, some of which were built in the 1600s. In From Here to Yender and New Hampshire Borns a Town, Rawson captured New England phrases, like "always astern of the lighter" (dead last), "has no more suavity than a swine", "I just ate chagrin" (embarrassment over a faux pas), "I wish I had a neck as long as a cartrut" (good drink!) and "mud time" (very wet spring periods).

She later wrote the town history of Plainfield, New Jersey, Under the Blue Hills, and in one passage she reminisces of her early years at Tier's Pond: "Today there may be places as cool and inviting, but I doubt it ... a place where the heavy white dishes curled thickly about the edges; where the chairbacks curled in a well-remembered design; where the chocolate, strawberry and vanilla ice cream mounded itself up inches high ... it was simply our idea of Heaven." She left in manuscript at her death but published as part of the town's bicentennial celebration in 1974.

In 1947 Rawson gave a lecture on "Art of the Quakers" at the Friends Historical Association Annual Meeting.

Published works

Books
Rawson authored and often illustrated her books:

Articles
 "American Textile Designs", Review of Reviews and World's Work. Review of Reviews Corporation, 1919.
 "Ancient Peru in Textiles and Pottery," International Studio, New York Offices of the International Studio, 1919

Notes

References

1878 births
1956 deaths
American women illustrators
American illustrators
American women writers
Writers from Plainfield, New Jersey
People from Scotch Plains, New Jersey
Swarthmore College alumni
American women painters
Artists from New Jersey
20th-century American painters
20th-century American women artists
People from Old Greenwich, Connecticut
People from Alstead, New Hampshire